Mateusz Chruściński (born 29 November 1987 in Katowice, Poland) is a Polish figure skater who competed as a single skater and pair skater. He teamed up with Joanna Sulej in 2008 and began competing internationally with her in the 2008-2009 season. They represented Poland at the 2010 Winter Olympics. They were coached by his mother, Iwona Myldarz-Chruścińska. His brother, Radosław Chruściński, is also a competitive skater. 

As a single skater, he is the 2006 Polish Junior national champion and the 2007 senior national silver medalist. He competed three seasons on the Junior Grand Prix circuit.

Competitive highlights

Pairs career
(with Sulej)

Singles career

References

 
 
 Joanna Sulej & Mateusz Chruściński at the UKŁF "Unia" Oświęcim

Polish male pair skaters
Polish male single skaters
1987 births
Living people
Figure skaters at the 2007 Winter Universiade
Sportspeople from Katowice
Figure skaters at the 2010 Winter Olympics
Olympic figure skaters of Poland